2,5-Dimethylthiophene is an organosulfur compound with the formula C4H2(CH3)2S.  It is one of four isomers of dimethylthiophene.  A colorless liquid, it is prepared by sulfurization of hexane-2,5-dione. It is approved as a food flavouring additive in Europe.

References

Thiophenes